The signalling system used on the standard-gauge railway network in Sweden is based on that of the traditional mechanical semaphore signals. Currently only colour-light signals are used, together with the Ansaldo L10000 Automatic Train Control system.

Main signals
The main signals (huvudsignaler) display the following aspects:

The aspects may seem a little inverted, since a single green light means proceed 80, two green lights Proceed 40, caution and three green lights stands for Proceed 40, short route. In other words: more green means more cautiously. Some other countries e.g. Norway have opposite. If there is a sign saying lower speed limit than 80, of course that is valid. The speed limits apply to trains without Automatic Train Control (ATC) equipment. If there is no ATC, signs can show higher speed, but rarely above 110 km/h. If there is ATC there can be even higher signs which are valid only with ATC.

Two light signalling (Malmö and Stockholm city tunnels)
On some urban lines, such as the City Tunnel in Malmö and the Stockholm City Line, a simpler signal system is in use until ERTMS is fully implemented. The interpretation of the signals follow the ERTMS level 1 standard, but the actual look is national.
This system uses two light signals with blue number signs (instead of yellow/white in normal signalling) and can show the following aspects:

These signals should not be confused with normal main signals with two lights, which have yellow number signs, while the "Two light signals" shown here have blue ones. The meaning is different to normal meanings of the signals, but if combined with a speed limit 40 (not valid for ATC) sign, the meanings are essentially the same.

Distant signals
Distant signals (försignaler) are informational signals used to give an advance warning about the next home signal.
The aspects a free-standing distant signal can display are:

The signal indication is the same as for the combined aspects in the main signals.

Dwarf signals

Dwarf signals (dvärgsignaler) are used as shunting signals and can show the following aspects:

There are also types of dwarf signals, called "Main Dwarf signals" (Huvuddvärgsignal) used as stand-ins for home signals in stations with lot of shunting or where there are a lot of switches that needs a signal. In addition to the dwarf signal aspects given above, these signals also have a red light and two green ones (one for "proceed 40", the other for "proceed 80").

Road crossing signals

Road crossing signals (Vägkorsningssignaler (V-signaler)) are used at road crossings. They tell the driver if the crossing is clear (lights flashing, bells ringing or, if available, gates are closed)
They can show the following aspects

The same aspects are also used at moveable bridges, but with another sign under the signal.

Distant road crossing signal
Some road crossing signals have a distant signal (Vägkorsningsförsignal (V-försignal)), placed at a distance (usually not braking distance) from the road crossing signal.

The distant road crossing signal is nicknamed "skull" (döskalle).

Fail safe

Because the aspects are in reverse with more green lights meaning slower the aspects are not fail safe, so lamp proving is needed to prevent lamp failure giving a faster aspect.

It is not permitted for Swedish drivers to drive into Norway and opposite where there is no ATC, unless extra education is taken (and before ATC was introduced everywhere in the other country except for a few kilometers from the border where crew change stations were located). This meant that freight trains Oslo–Narvik passed Hallsberg southeast of Oslo until the shortcut Kil–Ställdalen was upgraded to ATC in 2017.

ERTMS
European Rail Traffic Management System(ERTMS/ETCS) has been introduced on a few railways in Sweden. Mainly ERTMS level 2 is used, in which basically no light signals exist and all messages are shown on a display in the driver's places.

Two railways, Citybanan and Citytunneln use signalling according to ERTMS level 1, although ATC is still used there, not ERTMS (for now).

Rules on violation
An unauthorized stop signal passage (OSPA), ie the passage without permission of a signal or sign meaning stop (red main signal, vertical dwarf signal, ERTMS arrow sign and more) is considered a serious incident. They are divided into three categories, A where the signal showed stop even before the process, which may be due to the driver, failure of the train brakes, slipping and more, category B, where the signal was inadvertently set to stop due to technical error or mistake of the signalman, and category C, where the signal was intentionally stopped, for example due to a sudden danger such as a car at a level crossing. If it is suspected to be due to the driver, he may not drive any more until the investigation has been completed, and another driver may drive the train after an investigator has collected information about the train's route, usually causing a multiple hour delay. A driver who has caused several OSPAs permanently loses the license.

References
 
 Swedish signalling section of The Signal Page (TSP)

Notes

Railway signalling in Sweden